Andrew Victor Saville (born 12 December 1964) is an English former professional footballer who played as a striker. His professional career lasted sixteen years, spent at a total of ten lower-division clubs in the Football League.

Career

Saville was born in Hull. He made more than 100 appearances for his home-town club, Hull City, whom he joined from school. He was his club's leading scorer on several occasions, at Hull City in 1986–87, at Birmingham City in 1993–94, and again in 1995–96 for Preston North End, where he scored 30 goals in all competitions, his 29 League goals making him overall top scorer in the Third Division.

In 1992–93 he had the rare distinction of becoming top scorer for two clubs in the same season, scoring 20 goals in all competitions for Hartlepool United before moving to Birmingham in March 1993, where his ten games produced seven goals, a total which no other Birmingham player bettered over the whole season.

Personal life
Saville works as a host for the hospitality boxes at Hull City.

Honours
Preston North End
 Football League Third Division: 1995–96

Wigan Athletic
 Football League Third Division: 1996–97

Individual
PFA Team of the Year: 1995–96 Third Division
Third Division Golden Boot: 1995–96

References

1964 births
Living people
Footballers from Kingston upon Hull
English footballers
Association football forwards
Hull City A.F.C. players
Walsall F.C. players
Barnsley F.C. players
Hartlepool United F.C. players
Birmingham City F.C. players
Burnley F.C. players
Preston North End F.C. players
Wigan Athletic F.C. players
Cardiff City F.C. players
Scarborough F.C. players
Gainsborough Trinity F.C. players
Goole A.F.C. players
English Football League players